The Burin Peninsula is a peninsula located on the south coast of the island of Newfoundland in the province of Newfoundland and Labrador. Marystown is the largest population centre on the peninsula.

The Burin Peninsula extends to the southwest from the main island of Newfoundland, separating Fortune Bay to the west from Placentia Bay to the east.

It was originally named the Buria Peninsula by fishermen from the Basque region during the 16th century. The peninsula is also known as "The Boot" because of its shape.

Economy
For centuries there were plentiful cod, other fish and crustaceans, which supplied a thriving fishing industry. The eventual collapse of the Atlantic northwest cod fishery led to local mass unemployment during the second half of the 1990s.

In response to a decline in the cod fishery industry, the Newfoundland government refurbished the Marystown shipyard in 1992. Ownership left Canada when the American company Friede Goldman Ltd. bought the facility in 1998, and remained in American hands when ownership changed again in 2002 to Kiewit Offshore Services Ltd. By 2019, the shipyard had been idle for four years and was acquired by Marbase Marystown Inc. (usually just Marbase), under a 20-year lease with the intention of establishing a service hub supporting regional aquaculture, the first of its kind in Canada.  Marbase is a partnership between one Newfoundland businessman, Paul Antle, and the Norwegian company Amar Group AS.

In 2019, Marbase Cleanerfish Ltd., began work on a commercial lumpfish hatchery in Marystown, with an anticipated customer base of Atlantic salmon farm operators. As of 2020, government approval of the work in relation to environmental impact had not yet been completed.

Fluorspar (also called fluorite) deposits had been noted on the peninsula as early as 1843 but it was not until 1933 that mining began. The operation was started by American Walter Siebert whose company was named the St. Lawrence Corporation of Newfoundland. Backbreaking work and no pay initially, finally led to a more significant mine by 1937; a second mine also opened in 1937, the American Newfoundland Fluorspar Company.
The fluorspar mines in St. Lawrence were major employers until business declined in the 1970s; the mines had closed by 1978. In 2011 Canada Fluorspar Inc. outlined preparations to open a fluorspar mine on the site of the old mine. The federal government provided $5 million in funding in 2017 and the provincial government provided a loan of $17 million to finance the re-opening. Production finally commenced in mid-2018.

Communities

Route 210 traverses the length of the Burin Peninsula, running along the northwest side of the peninsula between Marystown and Fortune.  Route 220 runs from Fortune to Marystown on the southern side. A short connecting road Route 222 runs between these two roads west of Marystown. Routes 211, 212, 213, 214, 215, and 221 are numbered local roads.

The Burin Peninsula's economy is tied to the ocean, consequently most of its settlements are located on the coast; some are outports and have no road connection (such as South East Bight). Rencontre East, another isolated community, is accessible by a ferry port in Bay L'Argent and travels to Pool's Cove on the Connaigre Peninsula via Rencontre East.

The French Islands of St. Pierre et Miquelon are the last colonies of France in North America, they are located just a 25 km ferry ride from Fortune.

Communities on the north coast of the peninsula, beginning in the east:

 Terrenceville
 Harbour Mille
 Little Harbour East
 Bay L'Argent
 St. Bernard's-Jacques Fontaine
 Point Enragée
 Garnish
 Frenchman's Cove
 L'Anse-au-Loup
 Grand Bank
 Fortune

Communities on the south coast of the peninsula, beginning in the west:

 Lories
 Point May
 Calmer
 High Beach
 Allan's Island
 Lamaline
 Point au Gaul
 Taylor's Bay
 Lord's Cove
 Roundabout
 Lawn
 Little St. Lawrence
 St. Lawrence
 Epworth
 Lewin's Cove
 Burin Bay Arm
 Burin
 Port au Bras
 Fox Cove-Mortier
 Little Bay, Placentia Bay
 Creston
 Creston North
 Marystown
 Spanish Room
 Rock Harbour
 Jean De Baie
 Red Harbour
 Rushoon
 Baine Harbour
 Parkers Cove
 Boat Harbour West
 Boat Harbour
 Brookside
 Davis Cove
 Sandy Harbour
 Monkstown
 Great Paradise
 Little Paradise
 St. Joseph's 
 Port Anne
 Petite Forte
 Clattice Harbour
 Clattice South West
 Burnt Island
 Murphy's Cove
 Isle Valen
 Darby's Harbour
 Great Bona
 Little Bona
 Southeast Bight
 Toslow
 Presque
 Saint Annes
 Saint Leonards

See also
 1929 Grand Banks earthquake
 Frenchman's Cove Provincial Park
 St. Lawrence Laurentians

References

External links 

 The Heritage Run

Peninsulas of Newfoundland and Labrador